Elections for Ipswich Borough Council were held on Thursday 6 May 2010. One third of the seats were up for election and the council remained under no overall control, with Labour as the largest party.

After the election, the composition of the council was:

Labour 23
Conservative 18
Liberal Democrat 7

The Conservative-Liberal Democrat coalition, which had governed Ipswich since 2004, continued in office.

Ward results

Alexandra

Bixley

Bridge

Castle Hill

Gainsborough

Gipping

Holywells

Priory Heath

Rushmere

Sprites

St John's

St Margaret's

Stoke Park

Westgate

Whitehouse

Whitton

References

2010 English local elections
2010
2010s in Suffolk